This is a list of career statistics of American tennis player Sofia Kenin since her professional debut in 2013. Kenin has won one Grand Slam singles title at the 2020 Australian Open (she was also a finalist at the 2020 French Open), four WTA singles titles and two WTA doubles titles, as well as four ITF singles titles and two ITF doubles titles.

Performance timelines

Only main-draw results in WTA Tour, Grand Slam tournaments, Fed Cup/Billie Jean King Cup and Olympic Games are included in Win–loss records.

Singles
Current through the 2023 Dubai Open.

Doubles
Current after the 2023 Australian Open.

Grand Slam tournament finals

Singles: 2 (1 title, 1 runner-up)

Other significant finals

Premier Mandatory & Premier 5 finals

Doubles: 1 (1 title)

WTA career finals

Singles: 7 (5 titles, 2 runner-ups)

Doubles: 2 (2 titles)

Fed Cup/Billie Jean King Cup participation
This table is current through the 2020 Fed Cup

Singles: 6 (2–4)

Doubles: 1 (1–0)

ITF Circuit finals

Singles: 8 (4 titles, 4 runner-ups)

Doubles: 6 (2 titles, 4 runner-ups)

ITF Junior Circuit

Junior Grand Slam finals

Singles: 1 (1 runner-up)

Other ITF Junior Circuit finals

Singles: 6 (3 titles, 3 runner–ups)

Doubles: 9 (7 titles, 2 runner–ups)

WTA Tour career earnings
Current as of June 6, 2022

Career Grand Slam statistics

Grand Slam seedings
The tournaments won by Kenin are in boldface, and advanced into finals by Kenin are in italics.

Best Grand Slam results details
Winners are represented in boldface, and runner–ups in italics.

Record against other players

Record against top 10 players

Kenin's record against players who have been ranked in the top 10. Active players are in boldface.

No. 1 wins
 Kenin has a  record against players who were, at the time the match was played, ranked number 1.

Top 10 wins
 Kenin has a  record against players who were, at the time the match was played, ranked in the top 10.

Double bagel matches (6–0, 6–0)

Notes

References

External links
 Sofia Kenin at the Women's Tennis Association
 

Kenin, Sofia